Chhekati is a census town in the Gaighata CD block in the  Bangaon subdivision of North 24 Parganas district in the state of West Bengal, India.

Geography

Location

Area overview
The area shown in the map was a part of Jessore district from 1883. At the time of Partition of Bengal (1947) the Radcliffe Line placed the police station areas of Bangaon and Gaighata of Jessore district in India and the area was made a part of 24 Parganas district. The renowned novelist, Bibhutibhushan Bandopadhyay (of Pather Panchali fame) belonged to this area and many of his writings portray his experience in the area. It is a flat plain located in the lower Ganges Delta. In the densely populated area, 16.33% of the population lives in the urban areas and 83.67% lives in the rural areas.

Note: The map alongside presents some of the notable locations in the subdivision. All places marked in the map are linked in the larger full screen map.

Demographics
According to the 2011 Census of India, Chhekati had a total population of 4,995, of which 2,576 (52%) were males and 2,419 (48%) were females. Population in the age range 0–6 years was 390. The total number of literate persons in Chhekati was 3,832 (83.21% of the population over 6 years).

Infrastructure
According to the District Census Handbook, North Twenty Four Parganas,  2011, Chhekati covered an area of 1.8727 km2. It had 3 km roads. The protected water-supply involved tubewell/ borewell. It had 400 domestic electric connections. Among the medical facilities, it had 22 medicine shops. Among the educational facilities, it had 1 primary school, other school facilities at Deopul 3  km away. The nearest college was 15 km away at Bongaon. It had branches of 1 nationalised bank, 1 private commercial bank, 1 cooperative bank, 1 agricultural credit society.

References

Cities and towns in North 24 Parganas district